Mansurabad (also Romanized as Manşūrābād) is a village in Derak Rural District, in the Central District of Shiraz County, Fars Province, Iran. At the 2006 census, its population was 960, in 252 families.

References 

Populated places in Shiraz County